"Fun and Games" is the ninth episode of the sixth season of Better Call Saul, the spin-off television series of Breaking Bad. It was directed by Michael Morris and written by Ann Cherkis. The episode aired on AMC and AMC+ on July 18, 2022, before debuting online in certain territories on Netflix the following day. In the episode, Gus Fring discusses the death of Lalo Salamanca with the cartel, Mike Ehrmantraut ties up a loose end, and Jimmy McGill and Kim Wexler deal with the aftermath of Howard Hamlin's murder.

"Fun and Games" was met with critical acclaim, particularly for its character development and the performances of Bob Odenkirk and Rhea Seehorn as Jimmy and Kim. It marks the final appearance for Giancarlo Esposito (Gus Fring). An estimated 1.22 million viewers saw the episode during its first broadcast on AMC.

Plot 
Jimmy McGill and Kim Wexler leave for work while Mike Ehrmantraut and his men remove all traces of Howard Hamlin's murder from their apartment. When they return, Jimmy reassures Kim that they will eventually forget what happened, but Kim does not react.

Gus Fring meets with members of the cartel at Don Eladio's home. Juan Bolsa reads Hector Salamanca's statement claiming Gus killed Lalo Salamanca, since Lalo contacted Hector after his supposed death but is now missing. With no proof of Lalo's initial survival, Eladio dismisses Hector's request for revenge. To keep the peace, Eladio divides the Albuquerque-area drug territory: the Salamancas will control the South Valley, while Gus receives the area to the north. Gus later tells Mike to find a new crew to immediately resume construction of the meth lab. To celebrate, Gus visits a wine bar and converses with David, his favorite sommelier, enjoying his company before cutting the visit short. Mike informs Nacho Varga's father, Manuel, of Nacho's death and says the Salamancas will no longer target him and will face "justice". Manuel dismissively tells Mike he is no different from the criminals with whom he associates.

Jimmy and Kim attend Howard's memorial at HHM and learn the firm will downsize and rebrand. Howard's widow, Cheryl, questions them about the circumstances of Howard's death. Kim deflects blame by suggesting Cheryl failed to notice Howard's supposed drug problem, causing Cheryl to break down in tears. The next morning, Kim surrenders her law license. At home, Jimmy begs Kim to reconsider but finds she has packed her belongings. Kim tells Jimmy she loves him but they are bad for each other and will only hurt those around them. She reveals that she knew of Lalo's survival before he appeared at their apartment but did not tell Jimmy for fear it would jeopardize their scheme against Howard, which she enjoyed but now regrets. She then tearfully leaves him.

In a flashforward, Jimmy has fully embraced his Saul Goodman persona, living in a large mansion, frequenting prostitutes, and driving a 1997 Cadillac DeVille, with his iconic "LWYRUP" license plate, to his newly renovated office to meet with clients.

Production 
"Fun and Games" was written and directed by Better Call Saul veterans Ann Cherkis and Michael Morris, respectively. The episode was dedicated to Julia Clark Downs, an Albuquerque attorney who consulted for the show in regard to its legal system presentations. Downs died on October 5, 2021, in a traffic accident.

The episode marked the end of the drug cartel storyline on Better Call Saul. Giancarlo Esposito made his final appearance as Gus Fring, while Jonathan Banks made only two more brief appearances as Mike Ehrmantraut. The opening montage in the episode was 12 to 16 pages in Cherkis's script. The concept of directing a montage was not new to Morris, as he had worked on one for the season four episode "Quite a Ride". He said testing the props for the opening scene took a lot of time and precision. A music cover of Harry Nilsson's "Perfect Day", by Dresage and Slow Shiver, was recorded for the intro to accommodate the runtime. For the scene between Mike and Manuel, a fence was put in to symbolize imprisonment. Esposito and Reed Diamond, who played David, previously worked together on the television film Homicide: The Movie. Some of the images used during Howard Hamlin's memorial were taken from actor Patrick Fabian's personal Instagram account, slightly edited to avoid anachronisms.

The breakup scene was rehearsed to plan how the crew would shoot the scene with Morris, cinematographer Marshall Adams, camera operators Matt Credle and Jordan Slovin, and dolly grip Eli Schneider in the same room. Rhea Seehorn, who plays Kim, described it as an intimate, orchestrated dance to shoot the scene with a minimal number of cuts. Morris mentioned that they "covered essentially each side of the whole conversation moving from room to room in a single take, and we did not use a hand-held camera, which just means we had to build a very, very precise dolly track and a sound plan to get it covered, and the set wasn't really built for that kind of thing. It was a huge effort from everyone to cover the scene that way, but I wanted to do it because having rehearsed it with them, I knew that this was not a scene that you wanted to break up ... because they were so on top of the moment and we would have lost so much. The rehearsal was huge for us."

Morris said they filmed the transition to the final scene's flashforward in an "unconventional way" by not focusing on Jimmy's facial reaction to the "last time he's going to see this apartment probably in some real sense" and cutting to the future where "it's not him anymore. That was how we approached that. We shot each side of this in one unbroken take from room to room and pulling back. That's why the camera moves more than the camera often moves in a scene like this in Better Call Saul. Rather than try and maintain an emotional peak on [his] face, I'd rather just be in the room with him and just let it die."

There is some ambiguity surrounding the length of the time skip at the end of the episode. While the dates on Saul's license plate and handicapped placard may indicate the final scenes take place around 2005, Better Call Saul executive producer Thomas Schnauz stated that the events may take place closer to 2007. However, Schnauz later clarified that it could indeed be 2005, as he was not aware of the dates shown, though his estimation was based on the discussions from the writers' room. He explained that, "Ultimately, it doesn't matter what year [the episode] ends in. He's full Saul Goodman, prior to the events of [Breaking Bad]."

Reception

Critical response 
"Fun and Games" was met with critical acclaim. On the review aggregator Rotten Tomatoes, 100% of nine reviews are positive, with an average rating of 9.5/10. The episode received five out of five stars from Vultures Scott Tobias, four and a half out of five stars from Nick Harley of Den of Geek, and "A–" grades from The A.V. Clubs Kimberly Potts and IndieWires Steve Greene. Greene said the episode offered a "dose of the beautifully crafted anguish that this show has perfected. It's an hour of faces of people forced to reckon with what's now broken in their own lives, whether or not they fully blame themselves for doing the actual breaking." Entertainment Weekly included "Fun and Games" in its list of "The 33 best TV episodes of 2022".

The scene between Gus and David was analyzed by several critics, who concluded Gus was unwilling to start a relationship because he did not want to risk putting a loved one in danger. Harley said it was the first scene to challenge his perception of Gus, and wished the show had explored more of the character's thoughts and emotions before its end. Greene lauded the scene's direction and wrote, "It's a kind of genuine, uncalculated kind of interaction that Gus is rarely afforded (or that he rarely affords himself)." Alan Sepinwall of Rolling Stone described it as "remarkable", "lovely", and "terribly sad" and praised Esposito's performance as Gus. Sepinwall also said the scene between Gus and the cartel was tense because it felt like the end of their stories on Better Call Saul. The scene between Mike and Manuel was also well received. Tobias called it "extraordinary" and said Manuel's description of Mike was a reminder to the audience of Mike's true nature as a fixer: "He's so fully immersed in this cutthroat world of exploitation and death that he's lost touch with how ordinary people process loss or seek justice. His goodness is only relative to the vipers in his sphere." Harley complimented it and said it was "the sort of hardboiled, dark night of the soul stuff that Mike's storylines so frequently produce, and it's as excellent and heartbreaking as the rest".

The character development of Jimmy into the person he was in Breaking Bad received praise. Tobias said the transition from Kim's departure to Jimmy's new life was "brilliant": "We don't need to fill in the steps that got Jimmy from here to there because Jimmy McGill moved out right along with Kim. He's Saul Goodman 24/7 now." Greene wrote of the character, "There's an ever-so-thin line separating what Jimmy knows to be true and wants to be true. 'Fun and Games' is filled with the latter, tiny statements that you can almost see him trying to will into fact. Everything you need to fill in that episode-ending time jump ... is in seeing Jimmy plead for one last chance to make things right. And then failing."

The performances of Bob Odenkirk and Rhea Seehorn as Jimmy and Kim were praised by critics. Sepinwall called it an "absolute acting marvel" from the two actors. Michael Hogan of Vanity Fair said there was "so much amazing acting and dialogue" in the breakup scene that "you have to just sort of stand back and behold the ". Tobias said Seehorn "nailed the moment as usual". Harley thought the departure felt right for a series like Better Call Saul and said the two actors were "extraordinary": "You can almost physically see Jimmy trying to hold on as Kim pulls away from him. It feels honest, like a real breakup, and not too histrionic or staged." Harley predicted Kim would return, saying it was not a "proper goodbye" to the character. Potts felt the breakup "moved too quickly" but nevertheless gave the episode a positive review, noting how Odenkirk and Seehorn "display frighteningly real sincerity". TVLine named Seehorn the performer of the week ending on July 23, 2022: "Seehorn was masterful — and heartbreaking ... It was a stunning exit, and one we really hope isn't the last we see of Kim Wexler. We just enjoy watching Rhea Seehorn too much for that."

Ratings 
An estimated 1.22 million viewers watched "Fun and Games" during its first broadcast on AMC on July 18, 2022.

Notes

References

External links 
 "Fun and Games" at AMC
 

2022 American television episodes
Better Call Saul (season 6) episodes